Victoria Arango, Ph.D., is a Professor of Clinical Neurobiology (in Psychiatry) in the Department of Psychiatry at Columbia University.  She is the Director of the Diane Goldberg Laboratory for the Molecular Imaging of Neural Disorders (MIND) and the Laboratory of Chemical Neuroanatomy. She is also the Associate Director of the Division of Molecular Imaging and Neuropathology at the New York State Psychiatric Institute.

Dr. Arango pioneered anatomical studies in the brain of suicide victims, including biochemical, molecular and morphometric studies and her work was instrumental in bringing the utmost in scientific rigor to studies in postmortem human brain. These efforts have led to important new findings and long-standing collaborations with leaders of the field. Her work has focused on identifying brain biological abnormalities in mood disorders, suicide and alcoholism. Dr. Arango has served on many National Institutes of Health (NIH) study sections, and served as Chair of one for three years. She serves on the Scientific Advisory Board and the Grants Review Committee for the American Foundation of Suicide Prevention and is a member of many scientific organizations, including the American College of Neuropsychopharmacology, Society of Biological Psychiatry, Society for Neuroscience, International Academy of Suicide Research, and American Society of Hispanic Psychiatry. Dr. Arango has continuously received NIH funding to study suicide for over 20 years. She has published extensively in respected national and international journals and is considered an international expert in the field of the biology of suicide.

Sources
Department of Psychiatry, Columbia University College of Physicians and Surgeons
New York State Psychiatric Institute
Faculty Profile for Victoria Arango, Ph.D.

Living people
Year of birth missing (living people)
Place of birth missing (living people)
American neuroscientists
Columbia University faculty